The Rocketeer (titled Rocketeer in the UK and other countries) is an American computer-animated children's television series. It debuted on Disney Junior and Disney Channel in the United States on November 8, 2019, and on November 10 on Disney Junior in Canada. Based on the comic book superhero of the same name by Dave Stevens and the 1991 film, the series focuses on Katherine "Kit" Secord, a seven-year-old girl who receives the family jet pack for her seventh birthday. The series was aimed for ages 2–5. The series was cancelled after only one season.

Plot
In the town of Hughesville, seven-year-old Kit Secord learns she is secretly next in line to become The Rocketeer, a jet pack-wearing superhero who can fly. Armed with her cool new gear and secret identity, Kit takes to the skies to protect Hughesville and its residents from danger. Assisting her on her heroic adventures are her best friend Tesh, bulldog sidekick Butch, and airplane mechanic grandfather Ambrose Secord.

Characters

Main
 Katherine "Kit" Secord (voiced by Kitana Turnbull) is a seven-year-old girl who receives the family jet pack for her seventh birthday which reveals that she is next in line to become the Rocketeer, Hughesville's very own local town hero. She is the great-granddaughter of Cliff Secord. When operating as the Rocketeer, Kit's catchphrase is "Never fear, I'm the Rocketeer." She is a new character introduced in this series.
 Ambrose Secord (voiced by Frank Welker) is Kit's grandfather and the son of Cliff Secord who works as a mechanic at the Hughesville Airport.
 Mitesh "Tesh" Cheena (voiced by Callan Farris) is Kit's eight-year-old best friend who serves as Ground Control when Kit takes to the skies. He is also the inventor of the hi-tech gadgets and upgrades for her jet pack. Tesh is the inventor of Kitcom and the Kit Tracker. 
 Butch (vocal effects provided by Frank Welker) is Kit's pet bulldog and sidekick.

Recurring
 Dave Secord (voiced by Billy Campbell) is Kit's father who is a stunt pilot, which is where Kit gets her passion for flying. Campbell also played Cliff Secord, the original hero in the film, reprising his role in a newsreel seen in the episode "First Flight."
 Sareena Secord (voiced by Kathy Najimy) is Kit's mother who works as the manager and chef of the Bulldog Café.
 Valerie d'Avion (voiced by Navia Robinson) is Kit's flight school classmate and aspiring pilot whose parents own the Valkyrie Flight Academy. She owns her own plane called the Korsican Skyfang 75. Her superhero identity is the Valkyrie.
 Snickerdoodle (vocal effects provided by Frank Welker) is Valerie's pet chihuahua.

Antagonists
 Laura and Harley (voiced by Maria Bamford and Kari Wahlgren respectively) are two thieving sisters who like stealing things to use in their heists which often has them running from the authorities and the Rocketeer. Harley serves as the brains of the group and Laura has a ditzy personality. They are a clear homage of the golden-age comedy duo Laurel and Hardy.
 Sylvester Slapdash (voiced by Maurice LaMarche) is a thief and a master of disguise who utilizes many costumes in his capers. He is also known as the "Costumed Bandit." Sylvester is a homage of early 20th Century vaudeville actor and quick change artist Sylvester Schaffer Jr.
 Lilith (vocal effects provided by Frank Welker) is Sylvester's pet ferret. Lilith is a homage to Sylvester Schaffer Jr.'s wife and assistant Lily Kruger.
 The Great Orsino (voiced by Charlie Adler) is a magician that targets Kit's jet pack so that he can become the first flying magician.
 Deany (voiced by Parvesh Cheena) is the Great Orsino's hapless assistant. In "Super Deany," it is revealed that Deany has an engineering background where he helped to fix the Rocketeer's jet pack. His name is a play on Harry Houdini which is reinforced by frequent dialog of "Who? Deany."
 Doctor Doodlebug (voiced by Luca Padovan) is a kid genius who wears pillbug-themed armor. He invents machines suitable for his schemes out of the garbage that he steals.
 Newton (voiced by D. C. Douglas) is an A.I. that resides in Doctor Doodlebug's wristwatch. Newton advises his master on the course of action to take.
 Xena Treme (voiced by Stephanie Lemelin) is an extreme sports athlete with a big ego that she masks with a laid-back personality who is determined to stay on the top through whatever means possible.
 Cast-Iron Chef (voiced by Ted Allen) is a food truck chef who will target any secret recipes in order to improve his business. He wields a high-tech gauntlet that enables him to use any kitchen tool it contains. In "Sitti's Visit", it was revealed that his recipe-targeting motive comes from the fact that his father never let him in on his family recipes. Kit and Sitti persuade him to drop the recipe-targeting motive and create his own cookbook.
 Norman Sinclair (voiced by Raphael Alejandro) is the descendant of Neville Sinclair and heir to Sinclair Air. He conspires to become the new Rocketeer by taking the jet pack from Kit so that he can impress his father. He once pulled this off enough for Kit to enlist Valkyrie, Sylvester Slapdash, and Doctor Doodlebug into getting it back.

Hughesville citizens
 Lucille (voiced by Marianne Muellerleile) is an old lady who works as a cashier at the Bulldog Café.
 Alfonzo (voiced by Eric Bauza) is a sous chef at the Bulldog Café.
 Officer Crowfoot (voiced by Robbie Daymond) is a police officer of Native American descent who arrests the bad guys thwarted by the Rocketeer.
 Mayor Primshell (voiced by Kevin Michael Richardson) is the mayor of Hughesville.
 Richard (voiced by Julian Edwards) is a boy who resides in Hughesville.
 Taffy is Richard's cat that is often rescued by the Rocketeer.
 Mr. Coleman (voiced by Eugene Byrd) is Kit's teacher at the Valkyrie Flight Academy.
 Ben (voiced by Antonio Raul Corbo) is a boy who is Kit's classmate at the Valkyrie Flight Academy.
 Logan (voiced by Ian Chen) is a boy who is Kit's classmate at the Valkyrie Flight Academy.
 River (voiced by Kai Zen) is a girl who is a fellow Trailblazer to Kit and Tesh.
 Farmer McGinty (voiced by Mark L. Taylor) is an elderly farmer.
 Goose (voiced by Roger Craig Smith) is a clown that wears an airplane costume.
 Malcolm (voiced by Carlos Alazraqui) is an air traffic controller who works at Hughesville's air field.
 Aarush Cheena (voiced by Rahul Kohli) is Tesh's father, owner of Cheena Hardware, and Scoutmaster of the Hughesville Trailblazers.
 Chandi Cheena (voiced by Sarayu Rao) is Tesh's mother.
 Sonal Udana Cheena (voiced by Sarayu Rao) is Tesh's baby sister born in "Special Delivery". Her middle name Udana, which means "flying", is in honor of the Rocketeer.
 Irma Philpot (voiced by Susan Silo) is an old lady who lives near Hughesville.
 The Critter Gang are a group of animals that are friends with Irma. They consist of a moose, a hawk, a raccoon, two foxes, and some squirrels.
 Chantal d'Avion (voiced by Yvette Nicole Brown) is Valerie's mother and co-owner of the Valkyrie Flight Academy.
 Captain Michael d'Avion (voiced by Imari Williams) is Valerie's father, Navy Captain, and co-owner of the Valkyrie Flight Academy.

Episodes

Broadcast
The Rocketeer had its first international debut when it premiered on Canada's Disney Junior on November 10, 2019. It premiered in Latin America on April 6, 2020, and in Spain, it was previewed on July 20, 2020, and it officially premiered on September 28, 2020. It will premiere on Southeast Asia's Disney Junior & France's Disney Junior in 2021. It premiered on Disney+ in the United Kingdom in October 2020. It will premiere on Rai YoYo and Disney+ in Italy in 2021 and on Dutch Disney Channel in the Netherlands in 2021.

Following the season one finale, the series went into hiatus before unexpectedly getting cancelled. No exact reason was said, but given that a direct sequel to the film was announced for Disney+ the following year, it is possible that the series' end was to make way for the new movie.

Reception
The show received a positive review from Vodzilla, which praised the attention to detail in vehicle design, the strength of the characterization, and the diversity of the cast.

Awards and nominations
The Rocketeer has been nominated for five awards in the 47th Daytime Emmy Awards. The nominations are for: Outstanding Main Title for an Animated Program, Outstanding Performance in a Preschool Animated Program (for Maurice LaMarche in the role of Sylvester Slapdash), Outstanding Writing for a Preschool Animated Program, Outstanding Sound Mixing for a Preschool Animated Program, and Outstanding Sound Editing for a Preschool Animated Program.

References

External links
 on DisneyNOW

2010s American animated television series
2020s American animated television series
2010s American children's television series
2020s American children's television series
2010s American comic science fiction television series
2020s American comic science fiction television series
2019 American television series debuts
2020 American television series endings
American computer-animated television series
American preschool education television series
Animated preschool education television series
2010s preschool education television series
2020s preschool education television series
Disney Junior original programming
Disney animated television series
English-language television shows
Television series based on Disney films
Television shows based on comics
American children's animated adventure television series
American children's animated superhero television series
American children's animated action television series
American children's animated comic science fiction television series
Animated television series about children